Kenneth Rainsbury Dark  (born in Brixton, London in 1961) is a British archaeologist who works on the 1st millennium AD in Europe (including Roman and immediately post-Roman Britain) and the Roman and Byzantine Middle East, on the archaeology of religion (especially early Christian archaeology), archaeological theory and methods, and on the relationship between the study of the past and contemporary global political, cultural and economic issues.

Biography

He received a BA in archaeology from the University of York in 1982 and after taking his PhD in archaeology and history at the University of Cambridge taught at the universities of Cambridge, Oxford and Reading. Since 2001 he has been Director of the Research Centre for Late Antique and Byzantine Studies at the University of Reading and, since 1996, Chair of the Late Antiquity Research Group. He holds honorary professorships from several European and American universities, has written numerous books and academic articles and has directed and co-directed many excavations and survey projects, both in Britain and the Middle East including in Istanbul (Turkey) – where since 2004 he has co-directed a new archaeological study of the famous Byzantine church of Hagia Sophia and its environs – and in and around Nazareth (Israel). He is a Fellow of the Society of Antiquaries of London, the Royal Historical Society, and the Royal Anthropological Institute of Great Britain and Ireland, and a member of the Royal Institute of International Affairs - the only person ever elected to all four of these learned societies.

Works

Books

The Sisters of Nazareth convent. A Roman-period, Byzantine and Crusader site in central Nazareth, London, 2020
Roman-period and Byzantine Nazareth and its hinterland, London, 2020
Hagia Sophia in Context, Oxford, 2019 (co-author)
Constantinople: archaeology of a Byzantine megapolis, Oxford, 2013 (co-author)
Byzantine Pottery, Stroud, 2001
Britain and the End of the Roman Empire, Stroud, 2001
The Waves of Time, London and New York, 1998
The Landscape of Roman Britain, Stroud, 1997 (Co-author, Petra Dark)
Theoretical Archaeology, London and New York, 1995 (Chinese and Japanese translations were published in 2004 and 2006).
Civitas to Kingdom, London, 1994
Discovery By Design, Oxford, 1994

Selected academic papers

"The Roman-Period and Byzantine Landscape between Sepphoris and Nazareth", Palestine Exploration Quarterly 140.2, 2008, 1-16.
"Roman Architecture in the Great Palace of the Byzantine Emperors at Constantinople During the Sixth to Ninth Centuries" Byzantion 77, 87-105
"Globalizing Late Antiquity. Models, metaphors and the realities of long-distance trade and diplomacy", in A. L. Harris (ed.), Incipient Globalization? Long-distance trade in the sixth century AD, Oxford, 2007, 3-14
"The Byzantine Patriarchate of Constantinople and the Baptistery of Church of Hagia Sophia in Istanbul" (Co-author), Architectura 2, 2006, 113–30.
"Archaeology and the Origins of Insular Monasticism" Kathleen Hughes Memorial Lecture 5, for 2004, 2006, Cambridge
"The eastern harbours of Early Byzantine Constantinople", Byzantion 75, 2005, 152–63.
"The archaeological implications of fourth- and fifth-century descriptions of villas in the north-west provinces of the Roman Empire", Historia 54/3, 2005, 331–42.
"Late Antique Landscapes in Britain", in S.Scott and N.Christie (eds), Landscapes of Change, London, 2005, 279–99.
"Houses, Streets and Shops in Byzantine Constantinople from the fifth to the twelfth centuries", Journal of Medieval History 30, 2004, 83-107.
"Proto-industrialization and the economy of the Roman Empire", in M. Polfer (ed.), L’artisanat romain: évolutions, continuités et ruptures (Italie et provinces occidentales). Actes du 2ème colloque d’Erpeldange (26–28 octobre 2001), organisé par le Séminaire d’Études anciennes du Centre Universitaire de Luxembourg et Instrumentum (Monographies Instrumentum 20), Montagnac, 2001, 19–29.

References

Other sources
Ken Dark: Nazareth Archaeology Project 2007. Field Work, Travel, and Research Reports: Byzantium. (reed here)
Ken Dark. Contemporary Authors: A Bio-Bibliographical Guide to Current Writers in Fiction, General Nonfiction, Poetry, Journalism, Drama, Motion Pictures, Television, and Other fields (Thomson Gale: 2008)
Hammond, Norman. How Roman Britain went on and on. The Times. 17 April 1998. (reed here)

1961 births
Living people
People from Brixton
British archaeologists
Alumni of the University of York
Academics of the University of Reading
Fellows of the Society of Antiquaries of London
Alumni of the University of Cambridge
Byzantine archaeologists